Macrocheilus macromaculatus is a species of ground beetle in the subfamily Anthiinae. It was described by Dalton Clary in 1949.

References

Anthiinae (beetle)
Beetles described in 1949